Anisochaeta is a genus of annelids belonging to the family Megascolecidae.

The species of this genus are found in Australia and New Zealand.

Species:
Anisochaeta aemula 
Anisochaeta alba 
Anisochaeta ancisa 
Anisochaeta andrea 
Anisochaeta angusticlavia 
Anisochaeta aperta 
Anisochaeta aterpaenulata 
Anisochaeta brevis 
Anisochaeta buckerfieldi 
Anisochaeta bulla 
Anisochaeta calpetana 
Anisochaeta calvasaxea 
Anisochaeta celmisiae 
Anisochaeta cethana 
Anisochaeta chani 
Anisochaeta clavi 
Anisochaeta conspecta 
Anisochaeta corinna 
Anisochaeta coxii 
Anisochaeta eastoni 
Anisochaeta erica 
Anisochaeta felix 
Anisochaeta filix 
Anisochaeta flava 
Anisochaeta floris 
Anisochaeta garilarsoni 
Anisochaeta gigantea 
Anisochaeta greeni 
Anisochaeta ima 
Anisochaeta isla 
Anisochaeta kiwi 
Anisochaeta lata 
Anisochaeta lavatiolacuna 
Anisochaeta liberalis 
Anisochaeta longiductis 
Anisochaeta magna 
Anisochaeta martha 
Anisochaeta mawbanna 
Anisochaeta megagaster 
Anisochaeta metandris 
Anisochaeta novaeangelica 
Anisochaeta novaeanglica 
Anisochaeta novocombei 
Anisochaeta palustris 
Anisochaeta paucula 
Anisochaeta portusarturi 
Anisochaeta proandris 
Anisochaeta rava 
Anisochaeta rubeospina 
Anisochaeta scottsdalei 
Anisochaeta sebastiani 
Anisochaeta simpsonorum 
Anisochaeta stumpysinensis 
Anisochaeta tamara 
Anisochaeta toonumbari 
Anisochaeta trichaeta 
Anisochaeta tunicata 
Anisochaeta vincula 
Anisochaeta virgata 
Anisochaeta yabbratigris 
Anisochaeta zeehan

References

Annelids